Thomas Snow Beck FRS FRCS (1814 – 6 January 1877) was a British doctor and surgeon. He qualified as a doctor in London. In 1845, he was awarded the Royal Society's Royal Medal for his unpublished paper entitled On the nerves of the uterus. The paper was later published, but the award was disputed by the London-resident Scottish surgeon Robert Lee, who had published an earlier paper on the subject and reached different conclusions. This controversy led to reform of the award process for the Royal Medal, and is thought to have contributed to the resignation of both the President and Secretary of the Royal Society. Beck also carried out other work on nerves, including work in 1846 on differentiation between white and gray rami. He was elected a fellow of the Royal Society in 1851.

Sources
Entry for Beck in the Royal Society's Library and Archive catalogue's details of Fellows (accessed 21 April 2008)

1814 births
1877 deaths
19th-century English medical doctors
British surgeons
Fellows of the Royal Society
Fellows of the Royal College of Surgeons
Royal Medal winners